Castilleja miniata is a species of Indian paintbrush known by the common name giant red Indian paintbrush. It is native to western North America from Alaska to Ontario to California to New Mexico, where it grows usually in moist places in a wide variety of habitat types.

Description
This wildflower is a perennial herb growing up to about 80 centimeters tall, slender and green to dark purple in herbage color. The lance-shaped leaves are 3 to 6 centimeters long, pointed, and coated in thin hairs. The inflorescence is made up of bright red to pale orange or orange-tipped bracts. Between the bracts emerge the yellow-green, red-edged tubular flowers. Flowers bloom May to September.

Because most species of the genus are parasitic on other plants, sophisticated networks are formed between their roots and those of other species. They therefore cannot be transplanted in most cases. Its native habitats include wet mountain meadows and stream banks below .

Subspecies
There are three subspecies of this plant:
C. m. ssp. dixonii - limited to the west coast from Alaska to Oregon
C. m. ssp. elata (Siskiyou Indian paintbrush) - rare subspecies limited to the Klamath Mountains in Northern California and Southern Oregon
C. m. ssp. miniata - the common, widespread subspecies

Subspecies Gallery

References

External links
Jepson Manual Treatment
Photo gallery

miniata
Flora of the Western United States
Flora of California
Flora of New Mexico
Flora of Canada
Plants described in 1838
Flora without expected TNC conservation status